El Heredero is the second studio album by Puerto Rican reggaeton artist Miguelito. Some of the reggaeton artists that accompany him on his album are Divino, Randy, Gol2 and Daddy Yankee. This album was the Best Latin Children Album in the 2008 Latin Grammy Awards.

Promotion 
The first single from the album was “La Escuela”, whose video was shot in the classrooms of the Antilles Military Academy in Trujillo Alto under the direction of David Impelluso. Under the direction of Georgia Rivera and the photography of Rafy Molinary, Miguelito recorded the video for the single "Mochila de Amor", which he performs alongside Divino. The style of this song is based on bachata and reggaetón. "El son del boom" featuring Daddy Yankee, was the last single, a "vacilón" song that, according to the young singer, encourages those who are at home to "turn on the radio and dance".

Track listing

Awards 
On November 13, 2008, El Heredero won a Latin Grammy Award for Best Latin Children Album. The Dominican-Puerto Rican singer Miguelito became the youngest recipient in the history of the Latin Grammy Awards.

References

External links
 
 

Miguelito (singer) albums
2007 albums
Machete Music albums
Latin Grammy Award for Best Latin Children's Album